Amsterdam Heritage Museums is a foundation composed of museums in Amsterdam that wants to represent an important part of the city's heritage. These museums are: the Amsterdam Museum, Museum Willet-Holthuysen, Museum Ons’ Lieve Heer Op Solder, and the Biblical Museum. The foundation was officially founded in 2014.

The foundation started in 2010 when Paul Spies, director of the Amsterdam Museum, and Judikje Kiers of the Biblical Museum agreed on a partnership.

References

External links

 Amsterdam Heritage Museums http://amsterdammusea.org/en/amsterdam-heritage
 Museums of Amsterdam (OAM) http://amsterdammusea.org/en

Museums in Amsterdam